Red Raiders can refer to sports teams or bands at:

Germany
Kaiserslautern High School, in Kaiserslautern, Germany

United States

University
Northwestern College (Iowa), in Orange City, Iowa
Texas Tech University, in Lubbock, Texas
Shippensburg University of Pennsylvania

High school
Barnstable High School, in Barnstable, Massachusetts
Baylor School, in Chattanooga, Tennessee
Bellefonte Area High School, in Bellefonte, Pennsylvania
Bellingham High School (Washington), in Bellingham, Washington
Coatesville Area High School, in Coatesville, Pennsylvania
Earlville High School, in Earlville, Illinois
East Side High School (Newark, New Jersey), in Newark, New Jersey
Fitchburg High School, in Fitchburg, Massachusetts
Greenville Senior High School (Greenville, South Carolina), in Greenville, South Carolina
High School of Commerce (Massachusetts), in Springfield, Massachusetts
Jamestown High School (New York), in Jamestown, New York
Kauai High School, in Lihue, Kauai
La Crosse Central High School, in La Crosse, Wisconsin
London High School (Ohio), in London, Ohio
Madison County High School, in Danielsville, Georgia
Marion County High School (Alabama), in Guin, Alabama
Mechanicville High School, in Mechanicville, New York
North Quincy High School, in Quincy, Massachusetts
North Rockland High School, in Thiells, New York
Ocean City High School, in Ocean City, New Jersey
Paulsboro High School, in Paulsboro, New Jersey
The Pennington School, in Pennington, New Jersey
Tyler Legacy High School, in Tyler, Texas
Sidney High School, in Sidney, Nebraska
South Point High School (North Carolina), in Belmont, North Carolina
Spaulding High School, Rochester, New Hampshire
Torrington High School, in Torrington, Connecticut
Uniontown Area High School, in Uniontown, Pennsylvania, U.S
Wauwatosa East High School, in Wauwatosa, Wisconsin
Winnsboro High School, in Winnsboro, Texas

Middle/elementary school
Mabelvale Magnet Middle School in Mablevale, Arkansas
Oak Park Middle School in Decatur, Alabama